Water polo was contested at the 2015 Summer Universiade from July 2 to 14 in Gwangju, South Korea.

Medal summary

Medal table

Medal events

Men

13 teams participated in the men's tournament. All of the members of the US team were Bruins.

Teams

Pool A

Pool B

Women

10 teams participated in the women's tournament.

Teams

Pool A

Pool B

References

External links
2015 Summer Universiade – Water polo

 
2015
U
2015 Summer Universiade events